Breaking Down to 3 is the third album by Dave Moore, released August 17, 1999.

Critical reception

Jeff Burger of AllMusic writes, "Moore displays the rare ability to convey old, universal feelings in new and highly personal ways. He manages to be different and clever without ever lapsing into pretension or cliches."

Chuck Thurman of Monteray County Weekly says, "It's as if the album was created from the deep, ragged breath drawn by a bloodied boxer just before the bell rings for the next round."

Tom Dooley of Eclectica reviews Breaking Down to 3 and writes, "This is the kind of album that transcends the folk genre from which it originates. If you like Dire Straits, Greg Brown, Johnny Cash; if you're into country, rock, blues, or folk; if you like music, I'm betting you'll be blown away by this album." He concludes with, "On a groovy factor scale of one to five, we're talking a five or better here."

Jay Haeske of Back Road Bound concludes his review with, "One of the overlooked gems in the Singer/Songwriter field of the past 15 years, that's for sure."

Track listing

Musicians

Dave Moore – vocals, guitar, harmonica
Rick Cicalo – acoustic bass, electric bass
Steve Hayes – drums
Bo Ramsey – electric guitar, lap steel guitar, vocals
David Zollo – piano

Production

Producer – Bo Ramsey, Dave Moore
Mastering – David Glasser
Engineer – Brent Sigmeth
Mixing – Tom Tucker
Photography – Sandy L. Dyas
Executive Producer – Bob Feldman

Track listing and credits adapted from AllMusic and verified from the album's liner notes.

References

External links
Red House Records Official Site

1999 albums
Red House Records albums